The People's Republic of China competed at the 1988 Summer Olympics in Seoul, South Korea. 273 competitors, 149 men and 124 women, took part in 150 events in 25 sports.

Competitors
The following is the list of number of competitors in the Games.

Medalists

Archery

The People's Republic of China sent three men and three women to Seoul for archery.  The women were the more successful squad, taking ninth place in the team round.

Men

Women

Athletics

Men's Marathon 
 Cai Shangyan 
 Final — 2:17.54 (→ 26th place)
 Zhang Guowei 
 Final — 2:22.49 (→ 38th place)

Men's Long Jump 
 Pang Yan
 Qualification — 7.79m
 Final — 7.86m (→ 9th place)
 Chen Zunrong
 Qualification — 7.66m (→ did not advance)

Men's Shot Put
 Ma Yongfeng
 Qualification – 18.27m (→ did not advance)

Men's Decathlon 
 Gong Guohua — 7213 points (→ 31st place) 
 100 metres — 11.43s
 Long Jump — 6.22m
 Shot Put — 13.98m
 High Jump — 1.91m
 400 metres — 51.25s
 110m Hurdles — 15.88s
 Discus Throw — 46.18m
 Pole Vault — 4.60m
 Javelin Throw — 57.84m
 1.500 metres — 4:54.99s

Men's 50 km Walk
 Li Baojin
 Final — 4'00:07 (→ 28th place)

Women's Marathon 
 Zhao Youfeng 
 Final — 2"27.06 (→ 5th place)
 Zhong Huandi 
 Final — 2"36.02 (→ 30th place)
 Li Juan 
 Final — 2"53.08 (→ 54th place)

Women's Discus Throw
 Hou Xuemei
 Qualification – 62.64m
 Final – 65.94m (→ 8th place)
 Yu Hourun
 Qualification – 62.86m
 Final – 64.08m (→ 9th place)
 Xing Ailan
 Qualification – 59.26m (→ did not advance)

Women's Javelin Throw
 Li Baolian
 Qualification – 58.92m (→ did not advance)
 Zhou Yuanxiang
 Qualification – 56.36m (→ did not advance)

Women's Shot Put
 Li Meisu
 Qualification – 20.30m
 Final – 21.06m (→  Bronze Medal)
 Huang Zhihong
 Qualification – 19.71m
 Final – 19.82m (→ 8th place)
 Cong Yuzhen
 Qualification – 19.56m
 Final – 19.69m (→ 9th place)

Women's Heptathlon 
 Dong Yuping
 Final Result — 6087 points (→ 16th place)

Basketball

Men's tournament

Team roster

Group play

Classification round 9–12

Classification round 11/12

Women's tournament

Team roster

Group play

Classification 5–8

Classification 5/6

Boxing

Canoeing

Men

Cycling

Road

Men

Women

Track

Sprints

Diving

Fencing

15 fencers, 10 men and 5 women, represented China in 1988.

Men's foil
 Liu Yunhong
 Zhang Zhicheng
 Lao Shaopei

Men's team foil
 Lao Shaopei, Liu Yunhong, Ye Chong, Zhang Zhicheng

Men's épée
 Du Zhencheng
 Ma Zhi

Men's sabre
 Zheng Zhaokang
 Jia Guihua
 Wang Zhiming

Men's team sabre
 Jia Guihua, Wang Ruiji, Wang Zhiming, Zheng Zhaokang

Women's foil
 Sun Hongyun
 Jujie Luan
 Zhu Qingyuan

Women's team foil
 Li Huahua, Jujie Luan, Sun Hongyun, Xiao Aihua, Zhu Qingyuan

Football

Gymnastics

Handball

Judo

Modern pentathlon

One male pentathlete represented China in 1988.

Men's Individual Competition:
 Zhang Bin — 4081pts (→ 59th place)

Men's Team Competition:
 Zhang — 4081pts (→ 24th place)

Rhythmic gymnastics

Rowing

Sailing

Shooting

Swimming

Men's 50 m Freestyle
 Shen Jianqiang
 Heat – 23.41
 B-Final – 23.40 (→ 12th place)
 Feng Qiangbiao
 Heat – 23.47 (→ did not advance, 18th place)

Men's 100 m Freestyle
 Shen Jianqiang
 Heat – 51.40 (→ did not advance, 27th place)
 Feng Qiangbiao
 Heat – 52.45 (→ did not advance, 38th place)

Men's 200 m Freestyle
 Xie Jun
 Heat – 1:55.04 (→ did not advance, 39th place)

Men's 1500 m Freestyle
 Wang Dali
 Heat – 15:45.96 (→ did not advance, 24th place)

Men's 100 m Backstroke
 Lin Laijiu
 Heat – 57.74 (→ did not advance, 18th place)
 Huang Guoxiong
 Heat – 59.36 (→ did not advance, 35th place)

Men's 200 m Backstroke
 Lin Laijiu
 Heat – 2:08.28 (→ did not advance, 30th place)

Men's 100 m Breaststroke
 Chen Jianhong
 Heat – 1:04.09
 B-Final – 1:04.72 (→ 16th place)
 Jin Fu
 Heat – 1:05.02 (→ did not advance, 30th place)

Men's 200 m Breaststroke
 Chang Qing
 Heat – 2:24.45 (→ did not advance, 35th place)
 Jin Fu
 Heat – 2:26.05 (→ did not advance, 38th place)

Men's 100 m Butterfly
 Zhan Jiang
 Heat – 54.69
 B-Final – 54.50 (→ 9th place)
 Zheng Jian
 Heat – 54.86
 B-Final – 55.05 (→ 15th place)

Men's 200 m Butterfly
 Zhan Jiang
 Heat – 2:02.29 (→ 18th place)

Men's 200 m Individual Medley
 Xie Jun
 Heat – 2:10.52 (→ did not advance, 31st place)

Men's 4 × 100 m Freestyle Relay
 Shen Jianqiang, Li Tao, Xie Jun, and Feng Qiangbiao
 Heat – DSQ (→ did not advance, no ranking)

Men's 4 × 100 m Medley Relay
 Lin Laijiu, Chen Jianhong, Zhan Jiang, and Shen Jianqiang
 Heat – 3:48.18 (→ did not advance, 9th place)

Women's 50 m Freestyle
 Yang Wenyi
 Heat – 25.67
 Final – 25.64 (→ Silver Medal)
 Xia Fujie
 Heat – 26.66 (→ did not advance, 22nd place)

Women's 100 m Freestyle
 Zhuang Yong
 Heat – 55.84
 Final – 55.47 (→ Silver Medal)
 Lou Yaping
 Heat – 57.79 (→ did not advance, 23rd place)

Women's 200 m Freestyle
 Zhuang Yong
 Heat – 2:02.40
 B-Final – 2:14.23 (→ 16th place)
 Qian Hong
 Heat – 2:12.44 (→ did not advance, 40th place)

Women's 400 m Freestyle
 Yan Ming
 Heat – 4:18.58 (→ did not advance, 21st place)

Women's 800 m Freestyle
 Yan Ming
 Heat – 9:00.81 (→ did not advance, 26th place)

Women's 100 m Backstroke
 Wang Bolin
 Heat – 1:05.15 (→ did not advance, 23rd place)

Women's 200 m Backstroke
 Lin Li
 Heat – 2:18.11
 B-Final – 2:16.68 (→ 11th place)
 Wang Bolin
 Heat – 2:21.70 (→ did not advance, 23rd place)

Women's 100 m Breaststroke
 Huang Xiaomin
 Heat – 1:10.78
 Final – 1:10.53 (→ 7th place)
 Chen Huiling
 Heat – 1:13.65 (→ did not advance, 27th place)

Women's 200 m Breaststroke
 Huang Xiaomin
 Heat – 2:30.03
 Final – 2:27.49 (→ Silver Medal)
 Chen Huiling
 Heat – 2:45.87 (→ did not advance, 40th place)

Women's 100 m Butterfly
 Qian Hong
 Heat – 1:00.66
 Final – 59.52 (→ Bronze Medal)
 Wang Xiaohong
 Heat – 1:01.16
 Final – 1:01.15 (→ 8th place)

Women's 200 m Butterfly
 Wang Xiaohong
 Heat – 2:13.05
 Final – 2:12.34 (→ 7th place)
 Mo Wanlan
 Heat – 2:19.56 (→ did not advance, 22nd place)

Women's 200 m Individual Medley
 Lin Li
 Heat – 2:17.09
 Final – 2:17.42 (→ 7th place)

Women's 400 m Individual Medley
 Lin Li
 Heat – 4:48.89
 Final – 4:47.05 (→ 7th place)
 Yan Ming
 Heat – 4:49.04
 B-Final – 4:55.92 (→ 16th place)

Women's 4 × 100 m Freestyle Relay
 Xia Fujie, Lou Yaping, Yang Wenyi, and Zhuang Yong
 Heat – 3:46.36
 Xia Fujie, Yang Wenyi, Lou Yaping, and Zhuang Yong
 Final – 3:44.69 (→ 4th place)

Women's 4 × 100 m Medley Relay
 Yang Wenyi, Huang Xiaomin, Qian Hong, and Zhuang Yong
 Heat – DSQ (→ did not advance, no ranking)

Synchronized swimming

Three synchronized swimmers represented China in 1988.

Women's solo
 Zhang Ying
 Luo Xi
 Tan Min

Women's duet
 Luo Xi
 Tan Min

Table tennis

Tennis

Men's Doubles Competition
 Liu Shuhua and Ma Keqin 
 First Round – Lost to Miloslav Mečíř and Milan Šrejber (Czechoslovakia) 5-7 1-6 4-6

Volleyball

Women's Team Competition
 Preliminary round (group B)
 Defeated United States (3-0)
 Lost to Peru (2-3)
 Defeated Brazil (3-1)
 Semi Finals
 Lost to Soviet Union (0-3)
 Final
 Defeated Japan (3-0) →  Bronze Medal
 Team Roster
Li Guojun 
Hou Yuzhu 
Yang Xilan 
Su Huijuan 
Jiang Ying 
Cui Yongmei 
Yang Xiaojun 
Zheng Meizhu 
Wu Dan 
Li Yueming 
Wang Yajun 
Zhao Hong

Water polo

Men's Team Competition
 Preliminary round (group B)
 Lost to Spain (6-13)
 Lost to Greece (7-10)
 Lost to United States (7-14)
 Lost to Hungary (4-17)
 Lost to Yugoslavia (7-17)
 Classification Round (Group E)
 Lost to France (4-11)
 Defeated South Korea (14-7) → Eleventh place
 Team Roster
Ni Shiwei
Wang Minhui
Yang Yong
Yu Xiang
Huang Long
Huang Qijiang
Cui Shiping
Zhao Bilong
Li Jianxiong
Cai Shengliu
Wen Fan
Ge Jianqing
Zheng Qing
Head coach: Peng Shaorong

Weightlifting

Wrestling

References

Nations at the 1988 Summer Olympics
1988
Summer Olympics